In Pegu, Burma, the abucco (plural abucci or abuccos) was a unit of mass used for gold and silver. It was approximately 196.44 grams or 6.316 troy ounces.

Other units of mass were:
1 biza = 4 agiros = 8 abucci = 100 teccalis
1 agiro = 2 abucci = 25 teccalis
1 abacco =  teccalis

See also
 List of obsolete units of measurement

References

Obsolete units of measurement
Units of mass